Het Noord Nederlands Orkest (NNO; English, North Netherlands Symphony Orchestra) is a Dutch symphony orchestra based in Groningen. The NNO performs at De Oosterpoort in Groningen  and also on a regular basis at these venues in the provinces of Groningen, Friesland and Drenthe:
 Drachten, De Lawei
 Emmen, Atlas Theater
 Hoogeveen, De Tamboer
 Leeuwarden, De Harmonie
 Meppel, Schouwburg Ogterop
 Stadskanaal, Theater Geert Teis

History
The historical roots of the NNO date back to 1862, when the Orkest der Vereeniging De Harmonie (Orchestra of the Society De Harmonie) was established in Groningen.  This orchestra attained independent status in 1926 under the name Groninger Orkest Vereeniging, which was further renamed the Noordelijk Filharmonisch Orkest (NFO) in 1962.  In 1989, the NFO was merged with a second orchestra, the Frysk Orkest (originally from Leeuwarden), to establish the NNO in its present form.

The first chief conductor of the NNO was Jacek Kaspszyk, from 1991 to 1995. Subsequent chief conductors included Hans Drewanz (1995–1997) and Viktor Liberman (1997–1999). Alexander Vedernikov held the title of principal guest conductor (vaste gastdirigent) from 2001 to 2003.  Michel Tabachnik was chief conductor from 2005 to 2011, and now has the title of conductor laureate.  In March 2011, the NNO announced the appointment of Stefan Asbury as its chief conductor, as of the 2011-2012 season, with an initial contract of 3 years.  Asbury stood down from the post in 2015.

In 2018, Eivind Gullberg Jensen first guest-conducted the NNO.  Jensen returned for two additional guest-conducting engagements, the most recent in September 2021.  In October 2021, the NNO announced the appointment of Jensen as its next chief conductor, effective with the 2022-2023 season.

The orchestra's most recent managing director was Ingeborg Walinga, who was named to the post in March 2011 and formally assumed the title on 1 June 2011.  Walinga concluded her tenure in the post in 2021.  In October 2021, the NNO announced the appointment of Liesbeth Kok as its next managing director, effective 1 January 2022.

The NNO has made commercial recordings for such labels as Donemus and MuziekGroep Nederland, including music of Dutch composers such as Jacob van Domselaer and Jacob ter Veldhuis.

Chief Conductors
 Jacek Kaspszyk (1991–1995)
 Hans Drewanz (1995–1997)
 Viktor Liberman (1997–1999)
 Michel Tabachnik (2005–2011)
 Stefan Asbury (2011–2015)
 Eivind Gullberg Jensen (designate, effective 2022)

References

External links
 Official website of the Noord Nederlands Orkest
 Official English-language webpage of the Noord Nederlands Orkest

Musical groups established in 1989
Dutch orchestras
Dutch musical groups
1989 establishments in the Netherlands